Huamboy (possibly from Quechua wamp'uy "to navigate, to sail, to travel by boat") is an archaeological site with cemeteries and a village on a hill of the same name in Peru. It is located in the Arequipa Region, Camaná Province, Nicolás de Piérola District. The complex was declared a National Cultural Heritage by Resolución Directoral Nacional No. 1106/INC on August 4, 2009.

References 

Mountains of Peru
Mountains of Arequipa Region
Archaeological sites in Peru
Archaeological sites in Arequipa Region